Sefid Ab or Safid Ab may refer to:

Sefid-Ab, an archaeological site in Iran
Sefid Ab, Kermanshah, a village in Iran
Sefid Ab, Lorestan, a village in Iran
Sefid Ab, Markazi, a village in Iran
Sefid Ab, Mazandaran, a village in Iran
Sefid Ab, Qazvin, a village in Iran